
Gmina Strzelce Krajeńskie is an urban-rural gmina (administrative district) in Strzelce-Drezdenko County, Lubusz Voivodeship, in western Poland.

The gmina contains part of the protected area called Barlinek-Gorzów Landscape Park.

Villages
Apart from the town of Strzelce Krajeńskie, Gmina Strzelce Krajeńskie contains the villages and settlements of Bobrówko, Bronowice, Brzoza, Buszewko, Buszów, Chwytowo, Ciecierzyn, Czyżewo, Danków, Długie, Gardzko, Gilów, Golczewice, Licheń, Lipie Góry, Lubicz, Machary, Małe Osiedle, Ogardy, Ogardzki Młyn, Piastowo, Pielice, Pieńkowice, Przyłęg, Puszczykowo, Sidłów, Sławno, Sokólsko, Śródlesie, Strzelce Klasztorne, Tuczenko, Tuczno, Wełmin, Wielisławice, Wilanów and Żabicko.

Neighbouring gminas
Gmina Strzelce Krajeńskie is bordered by the gminas of Barlinek, Bierzwnik, Dobiegniew, Kłodawa, Krzęcin, Pełczyce, Santok, Stare Kurowo and Zwierzyn.

Twin towns – sister cities

Gmina Strzelce Krajeńskie is twinned with:
 Angermünde, Germany
 Jammerbugt, Denmark
 Tornesch, Germany

References

Strzelce Krajenskie
Strzelce-Drezdenko County